Misha Berson is an American theatre critic with the Seattle Times. 

In the 1980s Berson worked in San Francisco, first as the executive director of Theatre Bay Area and as performing arts director of the Fort Mason Center before working as theatre critic for the San Francisco Bay Guardian for twelve years. Since 1992 she covers the Seattle theatre scene for the Seattle Times. David Cote, writing for the Theatre Communications Group, listed Berson among the most influential theatre critics in America in 2011.

Berson authored a book on the musical West Side Story, Something’s Coming, Something Good: West Side Story and the American Imagination. The book received positive reviews with Brad Hathaway, writing for DC Theatre Scene, calling it the one West Side Story book one should own. Jay Handelman, writing for the Sarasota Herald-Tribune, said the book "could serve as a textbook study of the creation of a musical".

Berson chooses the winners of the Seattle Times' theatre awards, the Footlight Awards. She served on the jury for the 2015 Pulitzer Prize for Drama.

References 

Living people
American theater critics
Year of birth missing (living people)